SixDegrees.com is a social network service website that initially lasted from 1997 to 2000 and was based on the Web of Contacts model of social networking. It was named after the six degrees of separation concept and allowed users to list friends, family members and acquaintances both on the site and externally; external contacts were invited to join the site. People who confirmed a relationship with an existing user but did not go on to register with the site continued to receive occasional email updates and solicitations. Users could send messages and post bulletin board items to people in their first, second, and third degrees, and see their connection to any other user on the site.

SixDegrees was one of the first social networking sites of the general form that is in widespread use today. It was followed by more successful social networking sites based on the "social-circles network model" such as Friendster, MySpace, LinkedIn, XING, and Facebook.

MacroView (later renamed to SixDegrees Inc.), the company that developed the site, was founded by CEO Andrew Weinreich in May 1996 and was based in New York City. At its height, SixDegrees had around 100 employees, and the site had around 3,500,000 fully registered members. The site was bought by YouthStream Media Networks in December 1999 for $125 million. SixDegrees shut down one year later on December 30, 2000, then brought back up a few years later.

References

Further reading
 Bedell, Doug. "Meeting your new best friends: Six Degrees widens your contacts in exchange for sampling Web sites". The Dallas Morning News, October 27, 1998.

Internet properties established in 1997
Internet properties disestablished in 2001
1997 establishments in the United States
2001 disestablishments in the United States